Joseph de La Font (sometimes spelled Lafont; born 1686, died 20 March 1725) was an 18th-century French playwright.

The son of a prosecutor at the parlement de Paris, La Font composed some twenty theatre plays, alone or in collaboration with Lesage and d'Orneval. He is best known for his 1714 opera-ballet Le triomphe ou les fêtes de Thalie, with music by Jean-Joseph Mouret.

He died at the early age of 39 as a result of his passion for wine.

References

External links 
 His plays and their presentations on CÉSAR
 Joseph de La Font on 

18th-century French dramatists and playwrights
1686 births
1725 deaths